The Galway Youth Orchestra is the longest established youth orchestra in the West of Ireland and is also amongst the longest running orchestras in the country. It was first formed in 1982.

The idea of creating an ensemble which would perform under the banner of the Galway Youth Orchestra started with a young Cork graduate, Maire Ni Dhuibhir in Spiddal and developed initially by gathering players from school orchestras in Galway City, Loughrea and Tuam. Very quickly this orchestra developed an identity of its own and since then the Galway Youth Orchestra (G.Y.O.) has been shaped and developed by a number of conductors and hundreds of young players.

Junior Orchestra

Players, nine years and upwards, who are at a playing level equivalent to Grade 1 Associated Boards or Primary R.I.A.M. can audition  for Junior Orchestra. They are usually ready to move to the Intermediate Orchestra when they are Grade 3 standard.
In Junior Orchestra they are taught the basics of looking at the conductor and taking and interpreting his/her directions. They learn to listen to each other and become aware of intonation and learn the necessity of counting  and keeping rhythm.
These early years are also about honing their sight-reading skills because an orchestra player has a personal responsibility for reading their music.

Intermediate Orchestra

Players in this orchestra need to be at around a good Grade 3 or 4 standard. The instrumental skills are markedly more advanced than the average Junior and consequently the difficulty level of the music is higher requiring more developed technique. At this level the players are being trained to notice the dynamics and to be aware of the colour and texture of the written music. The classical repertoire is more extensive for this orchestra.

Senior Orchestra

Members of this orchestra need to be able to play at grade 6 standard or higher, as this is the basic level that the conductors aim for if they wish to include symphonic works in their yearly programme. Works by the great composers are played in their original form and the Senior Orchestra needs to complete two full concert programmes in a year.

Alouette Wind Band

To address the cyclical surplus of flute and clarinet players in Junior and Intermediate Orchestra this ensemble was founded under the directorship of Joanne Cater  in 2005.
It proved to be so successful that it has now become established as a G.Y.O. ensemble and is open to both Junior and Intermediate members and players who are not attached to an orchestra.

See also 
 List of youth orchestras

References

External links
 

Irish orchestras
Youth orchestras